Ephrata Township is a township in northeastern Lancaster County, Pennsylvania, United States. The population was 10,391 at the 2020 census.

History
The Erb's Covered Bridge, Jacob Keller Farm, Keller's Covered Bridge, Hibshman Farm, and Peter and Catherine Reyer Farmhouse are listed on the National Register of Historic Places.

Geography
It surrounds the borough of Ephrata, a separate municipality. The borough of Akron borders the southwest part of the township. Unincorporated communities within the township itself include Hahnstown and parts of Hinkletown and Frysville, all in the eastern part of the township.

Demographics

At the 2000 census there were 8,026 people, 2,691 households, and 2,101 families living in the township.  The population density was 494.5 people per square mile (190.9/km).  There were 2,747 housing units at an average density of 169.2/sq mi (65.3/km).  The racial makeup of the township was 96.19% White, 0.44% African American, 0.07% Native American, 1.82% Asian, 0.76% from other races, and 0.72% from two or more races. Hispanic or Latino of any race were 1.77%.

There were 2,691 households, 39.7% had children under the age of 18 living with them, 68.6% were married couples living together, 6.2% had a female householder with no husband present, and 21.9% were non-families. 18.2% of households were made up of individuals, and 6.9% were one person aged 65 or older.  The average household size was 2.92 and the average family size was 3.35.

The age distribution was 30.8% under the age of 18, 8.1% from 18 to 24, 27.8% from 25 to 44, 21.2% from 45 to 64, and 12.1% 65 or older.  The median age was 34 years. For every 100 females, there were 96.5 males.  For every 100 females age 18 and over, there were 93.2 males.

The median household income was $48,025 and the median family income  was $53,295. Males had a median income of $37,270 versus $22,487 for females. The per capita income for the township was $19,588.  About 3.5% of families and 5.9% of the population were below the poverty line, including 9.4% of those under age 18 and 5.2% of those age 65 or over.

References

External links

Populated places established in 1732
Townships in Lancaster County, Pennsylvania
Townships in Pennsylvania